Antoine-François Varner (23 April 1789, in Paris – 5 September 1854, in 3rd arrondissement of Paris) was a 19th-century French vaudevillist.

Short biography 
After he finished his studies at Collège Sainte-Barbe in Paris, Varner served for a while in the dragoons. He then joined the army and took part to the French invasion of Russia as deputy commissioner of war.

Unemployed under the Bourbon Restoration, he devoted himself to literature and composed comédies en vaudeville, either alone or in collaboration with Scribe, Ymbert, Bayard, Mélesville, Dupin, Delestre-Poirson, Dartois, Le Roux, Brazier, Duvert, Lauzanne, Deslandes and Prémaray.

After 1830, Varner obtained a position as chief clerk at the Prefecture of the Seine, a position that he lost after the French Revolution of 1848.

Works 

1817: Le Solliciteur, ou l'Art d'obtenir des places, one-act comedy mingled with vaudevilles (Eugène Scribe, Dupin, Varner, Ymbert, Delestre-Poirson), Théâtre des Variétés
1817: Les Comices d'Athènes, ou les Femmes orateurs, one-act comédie en vaudeville, translated from Greek Aristophanes (Eugène Scribe, Varner), Théâtre du Vaudeville
1818: L'Obligeant, ou la Fureur d'être utile, one-act comedy mingled with vaudevilles (Ymbert, Varner),  Théâtre des Variétés 
1819: Les Deux maris, one-act comedy mingled with vaudevilles (Eugène Scribe, Varner), Théâtre des Variétés 
1820: Trottin, ou le Retour du sérail, one-act folie-vaudeville (Ymbert, Varner),  Théâtre de la Porte-Saint-Martin 
1820: Le Dîner de garçons, one-act comedy mingled with couplets (Ymbert, Varner), Théâtre des Variétés 
1820: Le Propriétaire sans propriété, one-act comédie en vaudeville (Ymbert, Varner), Théâtre de la Porte Saint-Martin 
1822: La Marchande de coco, ou les Projets de réforme, one-act folie grivoise mingled with couplets (Ymbert, Varner), Théâtre des Variétés
1823: Le Faubourien, ou le Philibert de la rue Mouffetard, one-act comédie grivoise mingled with couplets (Ymbert, Varner), Théâtre des Variétés
1823: Le Précepteur dans l'embarras, one-act comédie-vaudeville (Ymbert, Varner), Théâtre du Gymnase, 3 July
1823: La Pièce nouvelle, ou les Assureurs dramatiques, comedy in 1 act and in vers (Varner), Théâtre du Gymnase 
1823: L'Intérieur d'un bureau, ou la Chanson, one-act comédie en vaudeville (Scribe, Imbert, Varner), Théâtre du Gymnase dramatique
1823: Monsieur Barbe bleue, ou le Cabinet mystérieux, one-act folie mingled with couplets (Dupin, Varner), Théâtre des Variétés
1824: La Léocadie de Pantin, parody of la Léocadie by Feydeau (Dartois, Dupin, Varner), Théâtre des Variétés
1824: La Mansarde des artistes, one-act comédie en vaudeville (Scribe, Dupin, Varner), Théâtre du Gymnase-Dramatique 
1824: Le Château de la poularde, one-act comédie en vaudeville (Scribe, Dupin, Varner), Théâtre de Madame 
1825: Le Plus beau jour de la vie, two-act comédie en vaudeville (Scribe, Varner), Théâtre de Madame 
1825: La Ville neutre, ou le Bourgmestre de Neustadt, one-act comédie en vaudeville (Ymbert, Varner), Théâtre de Madame 
1825: Le Plus beau jour de la vie, two-act comédie en vaudeville (Scribe, Varner), Théâtre de Madame
1826: La Charge à payer, ou la Mère intrigante, one-act comédie en vaudeville (Varner, Scribe), Théâtre de Madame 
1826: Le Mariage de raison, two-act comédie en vaudeville (Scribe, Varner), Théâtre de Madame
1826: Les Manteaux, two-act comédie en vaudeville (Scribe, Varner, Dupin), Théâtre de Madame
1827: Une soirée à la mode, one-act comédie en vaudeville (Varner, Jean-François Bayard, Le Roux), Théâtre de Madame 
1827: Les Petits appartements, one-act opéra comique (Dupin, Varner, music by Berton), Opéra Comique
1828: Les Moralistes, one-act comédie en vaudeville (Scribe, Varner), Théâtre de Madame 
1828: Le Bourgeois de Paris, ou la Partie de plaisir, play in 3 acts and 5 tableaux (Dartois, Warner, Dupin), Théâtre des Nouveautés
1829: Marino Faliero à Paris, folie à propos-vaudeville in 1 act (Varner, [Bayard), Théâtre du Vaudeville 
1829: Madame de Sainte-Agnès, one-act comédie en vaudeville (Scribe, Varner), Théâtre de Madame
1829: Théobald, ou le Retour de Russie, one-act comédie-vaudeville (Scribe, Varner), Théâtre de Madame
1829: La Veste et la livrée, one-act comédie en vaudeville (Mélesville, Varner), Théâtre des Variétés 
1829: La Cour d'assises, tableau-vaudeville in 1 act (Scribe, Varner), Théâtre de Madame 
1830: La Convalescente, one-act comédie en vaudeville (Mélesville, Varner), Théâtre du Vaudeville
1831: Les Deux novices, comédie en vaudeville in 3 periods (Varner, Bayard), Théâtre du Palais-Royal 
1831: L'Art de payer ses dettes, one-act comédie en vaudeville, (Mélesville, Varner), Théâtre du Vaudeville
1831: Le Salon de 1831, à-propos in 1 act mingled with couplets (Brazier, Varner, Bayard), Théâtre du Palais-Royal
1832: La Grande aventure, one-act comédie en vaudeville (Scribe, Varner),  Théâtre du Gymnase-Dramatique 
1832: Toujours, ou l'Avenir d'un fils, two-act comédie en vaudeville (Scribe, Varner), Théâtre du Gymnase-Dramatique 
1832: Paris malade, revue ingled with couplets, (Bayard, Varner), Théâtre du Palais-Royal 
1833: La Chipie, one-act comédie en vaudeville (Bayard, Varner), Théâtre du Palais-Royal 
1834: Un ménage d'ouvrier, one-act comédie en vaudeville en 1 acte (Bayard, Varner), Théâtre du Palais-Royal 
1834: Le Mari d'une muse, one-act comédie en vaudeville (Bayard, Varner), Théâtre du Gymnase-Dramatique
1835: La Pensionnaire mariée, one-act comédie en vaudeville, imitated from a novel by Mme de Flahaut (Scribe, Varner), Théâtre du Gymnase-Dramatique
1836: L'Oiseau bleu, three-act play mingled with song (Bayard, Varner), Théâtre du Palais-Royal
1837: Ma maison du Pec, one-act vaudeville (Mélesville, Varner), Paris, Théâtre du Palais-Royal 
1837: Le Bout de l'an, ou les Deux cérémonies, one-act comédie en vaudeville (Varner, Scribe), Théâtre du Palais royal
1837: César, ou le Chien du château, two-act comédie en vaudeville (Scribe, Varner), Théâtre du Gymnase-Dramatique
1838: Le Pioupiou, ou la Gloire et l'amour, two-act comedy mingled with couplets, Théâtre du Palais-Royal. The neologism "" to refer to an inexperienced young conscript was created in this play by Varner. 
1838: C'est Monsieur qui paie, one-act vaudeville (Bayard, Varner)
1838: Les Deux maris, ou M. Rigaud, one-act comedy mingled with vaudevilles (Scribe, Varner)
1838: Françoise et Francesca, two-act comedy mingled with couplets, Théâtre du Palais-Royal
1839: Chantre et choriste, one-act vaudeville, Théâtre du Palais-Royal
1839: Le Cousin du ministre, one-act comedy mingled with couplets, Théâtre du Palais-Royal
1841: Un monstre de femme, one-act comédie en vaudeville (Varner, Duvert, Lauzanne), Théâtre du Vaudeville
1841: Les Pénitents blancs, two-act comedy mingled with song, Théâtre du Palais-Royal 
1841: La Sœur de Jocrisse, one-act comedy mingled with song (Varner, Duvert), Théâtre du Palais-Royal
1842: La Chasse aux vautours, one-act comedy mingled with couplets, Théâtre du Palais-Royal
1843: L'Autre part du diable, ou le Talisman du mari, one-act comedy mingled with, Théâtre du Palais-Royal
1843: Recette contre l'embonpoint, two-act play mingled with couplets, Théâtre de la Gaîté
1843: Le Noctambule, one-act comédie en vaudeville (Varner, Deslandes), Théâtre du Palais-Royal
1843: Les Canuts, two-act comedy mingled with song (Varner, Deslandes), Théâtre du Palais-Royal
1845: Jeanne et Jeanneton, two-act comédie en vaudeville (Scribe, Varner), Théâtre du Gymnase-Dramatique 
1845: La Belle et la Bête, two-act comédie en vaudeville (Bayard, Varner), Théâtre du Gymnase-Dramatique
1846: Le Petit-fils, one-act comédie en vaudeville (Bayard, Varner), Théâtre du Gymnase-Dramatique 
1847: Le Chevalier de Saint-Remy, drama in 5 acts and 6 tableaux (Varner, Prémaray, music by Réancourt), Théâtre de la Gaîté
1847: Père et portier, two-act vaudeville (Bayard, Varner), Théâtre du Palais-Royal
1848: L'Académicien de Pontoise, two-act comédie en vaudeville (Varner, Varin), Théâtre Montansier 
1848: Ô amitié !… ou les Trois époques, three-act comédie en vaudeville (Scribe, Varner), Théâtre du Gymnase dramatique
1849: La Grosse Caisse, ou les Élections dans un trou, pochade électorale in 2 acts mingled with couplets (Bayard, Varner), Théâtre Montansier
1849: Un cheveu pour deux têtes, one-act comedy mingled with couplets (Varner, Duvert, Lauzanne), Théâtre de la Montansier 
1849: Babet, ou le Diplomate en famille, one-act vaudeville, Théâtre du Gymnase
1849: La Conspiration de Mallet, ou Une nuit de l'Empire, five-act historical drama mingled with songs (Bayard, Varner), Théâtre du Vaudeville
1850: Le Sous-préfet s'amuse, two-act comédie en vaudeville (Bayard, Varner), Théâtre de la Montansier 
1850: La Perle des servantes, one-act comedy mingled with couplets, Théâtre de la Montansier
1851: Le Vol à la fleur d'orange, two-act comédie en vaudeville (Bayard, Varner), Théâtre de la Montansier
1852: Madame Schlick, one-act comédie en vaudeville, Théâtre du Gymnase
1852: La Fille d'Hoffmann, one-act drama with couplets (Bayard, Varner), Théâtre du Gymnase 
1852: Les Échelons du mari, three-act comédie en vaudeville (Bayard, Varner), Théâtre du Gymnase

Honours 
 Chevalier of the Légion d'honneur (30 April 1843 decree).

References

Writers from Paris
19th-century French dramatists and playwrights
Chevaliers of the Légion d'honneur
1789 births
1854 deaths